Doi Pui (also known as the Doi Pui Hmong Village  to distinguish it from the mountain of Doi Pui) is a village administered as Moo 11 in Suthep tambon (subdistrict) of Mueang Chiang Mai District, in Chiang Mai province, Thailand. In 1999, it had a total population of 595 people. It is a White Hmong village that was founded in 1951.

One paved road from Phuping Palace leads to the village. The Hmong village of Khun Chang Khian lies to the northeast.

Tourism
The village is located within Doi Suthep–Pui National Park and is frequently visited by both domestic and international tourists.

References

Populated places in Chiang Mai province